Patrik Vostárek (born 3 May 1989) is a Czech motorcycle racer who has competed in the 125cc World Championship, the European Superstock 600 Championship, the Supersport World Championship and the Moto2 World Championship. In 2011, he won the Czech Supersport Championship.

Career statistics

Grand Prix motorcycle racing

By season

Races by year
(key)

Supersport World Championship

Races by year
(key)

References

External links

1989 births
Living people
Czech motorcycle racers
125cc World Championship riders
Moto2 World Championship riders
Supersport World Championship riders
Sportspeople from Prague